Starry grouper is a common name for several fishes and may refer to:

Cephalopholis polyspila, native to the eastern Indian Ocean
Epinephelus labriformis, native to the eastern Pacific Ocean